Nicole Joseph-Chin is the Chief Innovator, Founder and CEO of Ms. Brafit Limited, a Social Enterprise focused on healthy breasts as a catalyst for social impact. She is a Vital Voices #VV100 Women and 2015 Vital Voices VV Lead Fellow.

Career 
Nicole has conducted seminars, and workshops and has been hosted for speaking engagements about Breasts, Bra Fitting, Mastectomy Care, Social Entrepreneurship, Economic Empowerment, and Innovative Thinking on many local, regional and global stages. Nicole has participated in and influenced many global leadership communities in women's health initiatives, through her personal journey of innovation at her Social Enterprise – Ms. Brafit.

Nicole has appeared on many local and regional television segments, and features in Trinidad and Tobago, St. Lucia, and Grenada and is an alumna of Cherie Blair Women’s Mentoring Foundation since 2013. She is a Founding Member of the Women’s Entrepreneurial Network of the Caribbean 2013 – an initiative of the US State Department where she served as a Regional Board Member until 2016.

A 2011 alumna of the prestigious US State Department IVLP, Nicole has steered Ms. Brafit into the global arena and is a household name for adolescent development, mastectomy care, breast health and bra fitting, focusing on the influences of a healthy pair of breasts on the economy, the workforce and the wider community – influencing the comfort and the self-esteem of women and girls – from grassroots, to the corporate and from adolescents to women-in-treatment educating and amplifying the voices of their families and wider support systems.

Nicole has authored and designed many innovative breast-care, prevention, awareness and survivorship tools, including the Treatment Companion, a journal that encourages women to store their medical records in a transportable and attractive package as well as the Pink Slip Project, Beauty Beyond the Bruises. In October 2016 Nicole introduced the global and multi-lingual breast care awareness campaign The Gesture That Saves -  in San Francisco California to 100 global peers from 40 countries during the VV100 retreat.

Nicole has designed a comprehensive Breast-CareSolutions toolkit and is currently designing a reproductive-health advocacy program.

In 2014, she pioneered the MOOC Camp series at the US Embassy in Port of Spain and in the same year, provided facilitation of a workshop in Innovative Thinking for the CARIRI Business Bootcamp series.

References 

Year of birth missing (living people)
Living people
American women chief executives
American company founders
American women company founders
21st-century American women